Pandigital, Inc., was a digital photo-frame manufacturer founded in 1998 that around 2010 began to expand its product line to include e-reader, tablets and e-books. Its tablet products included the Planet, Novel, Star, Nova, and SuperNova, and an offline Wikipedia reader called WikiReader.

As of November 2012, Pandigital declared bankruptcy and went out of business. It liquidated its stock on various daily deals websites.

Tablet models

References 

American companies established in 1998
American companies disestablished in 2012
Computer companies established in 1998
Computer companies disestablished in 2012
Defunct computer companies of the United States